Peter Wood  (4 November 1935 – 24 January 2010) was an Australian politician.

Wood and his identical twin brother Bill were the sons of Les Wood, also a Labor politician. Peter was elected to the Legislative Assembly of Queensland in 1966, representing Toowoomba East; he moved to Toowoomba South in 1972 but was defeated in 1974.

Following his defeat Wood spent 22 years on Toowoomba City Council, serving as deputy mayor for 12 of those. He moved to Noosa in 2007 and died from cancer in 2010.

References

1935 births
2010 deaths
Identical twin politicians
Members of the Queensland Legislative Assembly
People from Toowoomba
Australian Labor Party members of the Parliament of Queensland